Roszczyce is a non-operational PKP railway station in Roszczyce (Pomeranian Voivodeship), Poland.

Lines crossing the station

References 

Railway stations in Pomeranian Voivodeship
Disused railway stations in Pomeranian Voivodeship
Lębork County